Richard Henry Weik (November 17, 1927 – April 21, 1991) was an American Major League Baseball pitcher. A ,  right-hander, he played for the Washington Senators (1948–1950), Cleveland Indians (1950), and Detroit Tigers (1953–1954).

Weik was hindered by problems with control. He issued 237 bases on balls in 213⅔ innings pitched and surrendered 203 hits during his Major League career for a WHIP of 2.059. He appeared in 76 games played, 26 as a starting pitcher.

In 1960, Weik attended the Al Somers Umpire School.

References

External links

1927 births
1991 deaths
Charlotte Hornets (baseball) players
Chattanooga Lookouts players
Cleveland Indians players
Detroit Tigers players
Little Rock Travelers players
Major League Baseball pitchers
Washington Senators (1901–1960) players
Baseball players from Iowa